Slobodan Vučeković (Serbian Cyrillic: Слободан Вучековић; born 15 December 1953) is a Montenegrin football manager and former player.

Playing career
Born in Danilovgrad, SR Montenegro, SFR Yugoslavia, he played most of the 1970s with FK Vojvodina in the Yugoslav First League, although he also had a spell in between with NK Maribor during the early 1970s. In NK Maribor he played 58 matches scoring 26 goals. While playing with Vojvodina he won the Mitropa Cup in 1977. In 1979, he moved abroad to France and played one season with SC Bastia in the Ligue 1. Later in 1981 he joined Greek top-tier club Alpha Ethniki where he stayed until 1984.

Coaching career
In 2009, he took charge as a coach of FK Srem in the Serbian League Vojvodina.

Honours
Vojvodina
UEFA Intertoto Cup: 1976
Mitropa Cup: 1977

APOEL
Cypriot Cup: 1999

References

External sources
 

1953 births
Living people
People from Danilovgrad
Association football forwards
Yugoslav footballers
FK Vojvodina players
NK Maribor players
SC Bastia players
Doxa Drama F.C. players
Yugoslav First League players
Ligue 1 players
Super League Greece players
Yugoslav expatriate footballers
Expatriate footballers in France
Yugoslav expatriate sportspeople in France
Expatriate footballers in Greece
Yugoslav expatriate sportspeople in Greece
Serbia and Montenegro football managers
Enosis Neon Paralimni FC managers
Ethnikos Achna FC managers
APOEL FC managers
Nea Salamis Famagusta FC managers
Serbia and Montenegro expatriate football managers
Expatriate football managers in Cyprus
Serbia and Montenegro expatriate sportspeople in Cyprus
Montenegrin football managers